Austria and the North Atlantic Treaty Organization (NATO) have a close relationship. Austria is one of six members of the European Union that are not members of NATO. Austria has had formal relations with NATO since 1995, when it joined the Partnership for Peace programme.

History 

Austria was occupied by the four victorious Allied powers following World War II under the Allied Control Council, similar to Germany. During negotiations to end of the occupation, which were ongoing at the same time as Germany's, the Soviet Union insisted on the reunified country adopting the model of Swiss neutrality. The US feared that this would encourage West Germany to accept similar Soviet proposals for neutrality as a condition for German reunification. Shortly after West Germany's accession to NATO, the parties agreed to the Austrian State Treaty in May 1955, which was largely based on the Moscow Memorandum signed the previous month between Austria and the Soviet Union. While the treaty itself did not commit Austria to neutrality, this was subsequently enshrined into Austria's constitution that October with the Declaration of Neutrality. The Declaration prohibits Austria from joining a military alliance, from hosting foreign military bases within its borders, and from participating in a war.

Membership of Austria in the European Union (or its predecessor organizations) was controversial due to the Austrian commitment to neutrality. Austria only joined in 1995, together with two Nordic countries that had also declared their neutrality in the Cold War (Sweden and Finland). Austria joined NATO's Partnership for Peace in 1995, and participates in NATO's Euro-Atlantic Partnership Council. The Austrian military also participates in the United Nations peacekeeping operations and has deployments in several countries , including Kosovo, Lebanon, and Bosnia and Herzegovina, where it has led the EUFOR mission there since 2009. Conservative politician Andreas Khol, the 2016 presidential nominee from the Austrian People's Party (ÖVP), has argued in favor of NATO membership for Austria in light of the 2022 Russian invasion of Ukraine, and Chancellor from 2000 to 2007, Wolfgang Schüssel, also of the ÖVP, supported NATO membership as part of European integration. Current Chancellor Karl Nehammer, however, has rejected the idea of reopening Austria's neutrality and membership is not widely popular with the Austrian public. According to a survey in May 2022 by the Austria Press Agency, only 14% of Austrians surveyed supported joining NATO, while 75% were opposed.

In May 2022, Finland and Sweden applied for NATO membership, while Austria announced that it would continue its neutrality policy.

Austrian NATO membership polls
A clear majority of Austrians oppose NATO membership.

Relationship timeline

See also 
 Foreign relations of Austria 
 Foreign relations of NATO 
 Enlargement of NATO 
 Partnership for Peace
 Accession of Austria to the European Union
 European Union–NATO relations

Austria's foreign relations with NATO member states:

References

External links 
Official website of Austria's mission to NATO
Relations with Austria – NATO website 
 

   
Austria–NATO relations
Foreign relations of Austria
NATO relations